A virtual piano is an application (software) designed to simulate playing a piano on a computer. The virtual piano is played using a keyboard and/or mouse and typically comes with many features found on a digital piano.

Virtual player piano software can simultaneously play MIDI / score music files, highlight the piano keys corresponding to the notes and highlight the sheet music notes.

See also

 Synthesia
 Scorewriter
 List of music software
Ampedstudio

References

Piano
Music software
Musical composition